Ina Weisse is a German actress, screenwriter and film director. She is especially well known for her roles as the distant and ambivalent blonde. She became apparent with roles in films like Tatort und Polizeiruf 110. She won several awards with her films, regarding acting and directing films in Germany. Even though that the movies she directed have been successful, she is still better known as an actress than as a director.

Life and education 
Ina Weisse was born on 12 June 1968 in West Berlin and is the daughter of a respected architect and an art mistress, which influenced her very early to choose an artistic life journey. But it was her uncle, who introduced her to the theater, as he took her to the Berliner Schaubühne.

After she finished her degree at the acting school Otto-Falckenberg-Schule in Munich, received Ina Weisse her first engagement at the National Theatre Mannheim. Afterwards she started to study philosophy in Heidelberg in 1992. In 2002 she finished her second degree at the University of Hamburg, where she studied film direction and production by Hark Bohm. Her graduation movie Alles anders was honored with the First Steps Award First Steps Award.

Ina Weisse is married to the German Film director Matti Geschonneck, with whom she worked together for the TV-films Duell in der Nacht (2007), Tod in Istanbul (2009), Der Verdacht (2010) und Das Ende einer Nacht (2011).

Career 
Her first theater debut was with the comedy movie called Echte Kerle (1996). Henceforth she was seen in many TV- productions and several times in the German crime series Tatort. Weisse started in 2001 with making short movies, which have been successful and can be seen as her start for TV productions.
 (2008) was her debut as a film director, for which she had been writing the script together with Daphne Charizani. Matthias Schweighöfer, Josef Bierbichler and Sandra Hüller, famous German actors, played the main roles in the drama. The movie was screened at the Berlinale and Max-Ophüls-Filmfestival in 2009 and was priced for the best screenplay. The film critic Stefanie Rufle wrote: ”It's a mature direction debut, which Ina Weisse handled stabile and confident".

Filmography

As actress

As director

Awards

Further reading 
Ina Weisse articles
Interview with Ina Weisse
Ina Weisse at pr-emani.de
Ina Weisse at prisma-online.d
Biography at firststeps.de
Filmography

References

External links 

Ina Weisse at filmportal.de
Interview with Ina Weisse
Interview with Ina Weisse

German film actresses
Mass media people from Berlin
German women film directors
1968 births
Living people
University of Hamburg alumni